Tarapith is a 13-century Hindu temple in Chandipur village Rampurhat II CD block in Rampurhat subdivision of Birbhum district of the Indian state of West Bengal, known for its Tantric temple and its adjoining cremation (Maha Shmashan) grounds where sādhanā (tantric rituals) are performed. The Tantric Hindu temple is dedicated to the goddess Tara, a fearsome Tantric aspect of the Devi, the chief temples of Shaktism. Tarapith derives its name from its association as the most important centre of Tara worship.

Tarapith is also famous for Sadhak Bamakhepa, known as the avadhuta or "mad saint", who worshipped in the temple and resided in the cremation grounds as a mendicant and practised and perfected yoga and the tantric arts under the tutelage of another famous saint, Kailashpathi Baba. Bamakhepa dedicated his entire life to the worship of Tara Maa. His ashram is also located in bank of Dwaraka river and close to the Tara temple.

Geography
Tarapith is a village of Sahapur Gram Panchayet, Tarapith Police Station located on the banks of the Dwarka River in West Bengal. It is located in the flood plains amidst green paddy fields. It looks like a typical Bengali village with thatched roof huts and fish tanks. The town is located 6 km from Rampurhat Sub-Division in the Birbhum district. "Rampurhat" and 'Tarapith Road' are the nearest Railway stations.

Legend and importance

There are several legends narrated on the origin and importance of this place, all related to the goddess Tara deified in the Tarapith temple. A well-known legend relates to the Shakti Piths. Sati, the consort of Shiva, felt insulted when her father Daksha deliberately did not invite Shiva to the great yajña "the fire sacrifice" he organized. Despite of Shiva's refusal citing that they're not invited, when Sati however arrived to the scene, Daksha insulted Shiva by saying cuss words for him in front of all the attendants. Unable to bear this humiliation, Sati gave up her life by jumping into the yajña fire. Infuriated by this tragic turn of events, Shiva went wild. Then, Vishnu, in order to pacify Shiva, decimated the body of Sati with his chakram. Sati's body part fell all over the Indian subcontinent. The places where the body parts fell have become centres of worship of the Goddess in different manifestations. There are 51 such holy temples which are called Shakti Piths; in West Bengal, there are many  such piths, such as the Kalighat.

Vashistha had seen this form and worshipped the goddess Sati in the form of Tara. Another legend describes the following: Shiva had drunk the poison that had emerged by the churning of the cosmic oceans, to save the universe. To relieve the intense burning in his throat, Sati – in the form of Tara – breast fed Shiva to relieve him of the effect of poison in his throat. Another local narration is that Vasishtha chose this place for the worship of Sati as it was already known as a Tarapith. Among piths, Tarapith is a siddha pith, which grants enlightenment, wisdom, happiness and siddhis ("supernatural powers").
 
Another oral legend about the temple states that the sage Vashishtha practised austerities toward Tara, but was unsuccessful, so on the advice of a divine voice, he went to meet the Buddha – an avatar of Vishnu according to some schools of Hinduism – in Tibet. The Buddha instructed Vasishtha to worship Tara through the practices of vamachara. During this time, Buddha had a vision of Tarapith as an ideal location for a temple that would serve to enshrine the image of Tara. Buddha advised Vasishtha to go to Tarapith, the abode of Tara. At Tarapith, Vasishtha performed penance by reciting Tara mantra 300,000 times. Tara was pleased with Vasishtha's penance and appeared before him. Vasishtha appealed to Tara to appear before him in the form of a mother suckling Shiva on her breast, the form that Buddha had seen in his divine vision. Tara then incarnated herself in that form before Vasishtha and turned into a stone image. Since then Tara is worshipped in the Tarapith temple in the form of a mother suckling Shiva on her breast.

Tarapith, Kalighat and Nabadwip are considered the most important tirthas (holy places with a sacred water body) for Bengali Hindus.

The shrine as a Sidhha Pith - Tarapith
 

The shrine gets its name being a Sidhha Pith. Sidhha Pith holy temples of Tara Maa. They are believed to have originated due to the falling of body parts of the corpse of Sati Devi, when Lord Shiva carried it and wandered in sorrow. There are 51 Shakti Peeth all over South Asia is linked to the 51 letters in Sanskrit. The Shakti Peethas are associated with the mythology of Daksha yaga and Sati's self immolation. These shrines are important place of worship for Tantra practitioners.

Tarapith temple

The Tara temple in Tarapith is a medium-sized temple in the rural precincts of Bengal. Its fame as a pilgrimage centre with the deity of Tara enshrined in it. 

The temple base is thick with thick walls, built of red brick. The superstructure has covered passages with many arches raising to the pinnacle with a spire (shikara). The image of the deity is enshrined under the eaves in the sanctum. There are two Tara images in the sanctum. The stone image of Tara depicted as a mother suckling Shiva – the "primordial image" (seen in the inset of the fierce form of the image of Tara) is camouflaged by a three feet metal image, that the devotee normally seen. It represents Tara in her fiery form with four arms, wearing a garland of skulls and a protruding tongue. Crowned with a silver crown and with flowing hair, the outer image wrapped in a sari and decked in marigold garlands with a silver umbrella over its head. The forehead of the metal image is adorned with red kumkum (vermilion). Priests take a speck of this kumkum and apply it on the foreheads of the devotees as a mark of Tara's blessings. The devotees offer coconuts, bananas and silk saris, and unusually bottles of whisky.   The primordial image of Tara has been described as a "dramatic Hindu image of Tara's gentler aspect".

The priests of the temple offer puja (worship) with great reverence, in order to reveal her motherly aspect to the devotees. Their worship blends the fierce North Indian depiction of the Sati myth of the goddess with the peaceful motherly visionary form of Tara, as seen by Buddha and his disciple Vasishtha of the Tantric tradition – the Buddhist Tara form. At Tarapith, though the softer motherly aspect of the fierce goddess is emphasized. The chanting of hymns or stotrams in her praise is also a part of the devotional appeal made to the goddess.

The devotees take a holy bath at the sacred tank(Jivita Kunda) adjacent to the temple before entering the temple premises to offer worship and even after the worship. The waters of the tank is said to have healing powers and even restore life to the dead.
 
Blood sacrifice of goats is the daily norm in the temple. Devotees who offer such goat sacrifices seek blessings from the deity. They bathe the goats in the holy tank near the temple before the sacrifice. They also purify themselves by taking bath in the holy tank before offering worship to the deity. The goat is then tethered to a stake, the designated post in a sand pit, and the neck of the goat butchered with a single stroke by a special sword. A small quantity of the blood of the goat is then collected in a vessel and offered to the deity in the temple. The devotees also smear their forehead with a bit of blood from the pit, as a mark of reverence to the deity.

Cremation ground

The cremation ground (maha smasan), amidst dark forest surroundings, is located on the river side at the end of town limits, away from the village life and practices of the Bengali social order. In Bengal, the cremation ground of Tarapith is also considered integral to the Shakti pith. It is believed that goddess Tara can be seen in shadows drinking blood of goats which are sacrificed every day at her altar, to satiate her anger and seek favours.

Tantric practitioners believe that Tara is attracted to bones and skeletons and the cremation ground is her preferred residence. Goddess Tara's iconographic depictions show her amidst cremation grounds. Tantric practitioners have, therefore, been flocking these grounds for generations for performing their Tantric sadhana (spiritual practice); many Sadhus permanently reside here. The cremation grounds are flowed by the "dread locked ash-smeared sadhus". Sadhus have built their hutments, amidst banyan trees and embellished their huts with red-painted skulls embedded into the mud walls. In addition, calendar pictures of Hindu goddesses, saints of Tarapith and a trishul (trident) decorated with marigold garlands and skulls at the entrance are a common sight in front of the huts. Human as well as animal skulls like those of jackals and vultures – which are unfit for Tantric rites – and snake skins decorate the huts. Good skulls used for tantric rituals and for drinking purpose by the Tantrics are cured before use; skulls of virgins and people who have committed suicide are said to be powerful.

Bamakhepa

A saint, held in great reverence in Tarapith and whose shrine is also located in the vicinity of the Tara temple, was Bamakhepa (1837–1911) popularly known as the "mad saint". Bama-khepa, literally means the mad ("khepa") follower of "left handed" ("Bama" or "Vama" in Sanskrit) path – the Tantric way of worship. Bamakhepa, goddess Tara's ardent devotee lived near the temple and meditated in the cremation grounds. He was a contemporary of another famous Bengali saint Ramakrishna. At a young age, he left his house and came under the tutelage of a saint named Kailsahpathi Baba, who lived in Tarapith. He perfected yoga and Tantric sadhana (worship), which resulted in his becoming the spiritual head of Tarapith. He also went to Devi Moulakhsi Temple at Maluti village for worship. People came to him seeking blessings or cures for their illness, in distress or just to meet him. He did not follow the set rules of the temple and, as a result, was once assaulted by temple priests for having taken food meant as an offering for the deity.Tara Ma  appeared in the dream of Maharani ("Queen") of Natore- Rani Annadasundari Devi and told her to feed the saint first as he was her son. After this incident, Bamakhepa was fed first in the temple before the deity and nobody obstructed him. It is believed that Tara gave a vision to Bamakhepa in the cremation grounds, in her ferocious form, before taking him to her breast.

References

Bibliography

Further reading
Tarapith Vairab By Susil Kumar Bandopadhyay
Tirthabhumi Tarapith By Probodh Kumar Bandopadhyay
Mahapith Tarapith by Bipul Kumar Gangopadhyay

External links

 Tarapith website 
 

13th-century Hindu temples
Cities and towns in Birbhum district
Hindu temples in West Bengal
Shakti Peethas
Shakti temples
Pilgrimage in India
Hindu temples in Birbhum district